The Grand Mosque of Bucharest was a proposed mosque to be built in Bucharest, Romania, using funds provided by Turkey and land gifted by the Romanian Government.

The building of the mosque was negotiated with the Turkish Government by Romanian Prime Minister Victor Ponta in 2015 and discussions continued under Romanian President Klaus Iohannis. In 2018, the project was abandoned due to the lack of funds.

Negotiations with Turkey 
The discussions between Romania and Turkey about the construction of a mosque in Bucharest were stalled for 14 years because the Romanian Government demanded that the Romanian Orthodox Church also be allowed to build a church in Istanbul, something which the Turkish Government refused.

In 2015, Romanian Prime Minister Victor Ponta signed a deal which allowed the Turkish Government to build the mosque in Bucharest without getting the right for the Romanian Orthodox Church to build a church in return. The Turkish president, Recep Tayyip Erdoğan, only agreed for the Romanian side to build a chapel and a pilgrim center for Romanian believers.

During the visit of Klaus Iohannis, the Romanian President, in Turkey in March 2016, the president of Turkey asked Iohannis to help the Muftiate obtain authorization for the construction of a mosque from the General Council of Bucharest.

Building 
The Turkish Government was expected to give 3 million € for the building of the mosque, while the Romanian Government provided 11,000 m2 of land near Romexpo, in the northern part of Bucharest, priced at 4 million €. The mosque was supposed to have a capacity for 2,000 persons and to also include a Madrassa and a library.

Opposition 
There was certain opposition to the project in Bucharest. In fact, former Romanian President Traian Băsescu argued that Romania doesn't need "an accelerated Islamization process" and that the Muslims of Dobruja already have the mosques they need.

All of the major candidates to the office of Mayor of Bucharest (including Gabriela Firea of the PSD, Ludovic Orban from the PNL and the independent politician Nicușor Dan) either voiced opposition to the construction or demanded a local referendum.

Abandonement 
In July 2018, it was announced that the project had been abandoned due to a lack of funds. The land was given back to the government.

See also 
 Islam in Romania
 Turks of Romania
 Romania–Turkey relations

References 

Religious buildings and structures in Bucharest
Proposed buildings and structures in Romania